Meakes is the surname of the following people

Patronyme
Bill Meakes (born in 1991), Australien rugby player
Frank Meakes (1917-1989), Canadian politician in Saskatchewan
Yasmin Meakes (born in 1994), Australian rugby player

See also
Meaker